AO UniCredit Bank is a Russian bank headquartered in Moscow. It was a wholly owned subsidiary of Italy-based UniCredit Group.

History
ZAO International Moscow Bank (IMB) was founded on 19 October 1989. In 2005, Bank Austria along with its parent company HypoVereinsbank was acquired by UniCredit Group. (Bank Austria remained as the direct parent company of the Russian bank until September 2016) 

In 2007, IMB was renamed as ZAO UniCredit Bank. 

In May 2013, the bank merged its own ATM network with the Raiffeisenbank ATM network.

In 2014, the bank was registered as AO UniCredit Bank.

In March 2019, UniCredit Bank topped the list of the most reliable banks in Russia according to Forbes experts, ahead of 99 other banks, including Raiffeisenbank.

The Owners
Until October 2016, 100% of the bank's voting shares belonged to UniCredit Bank Austria AG (Vienna, Austria), which is part of the Italian group UniCredit.

Activity
AO UniCredit Bank has a general banking license No. 1. The bank specializes in servicing corporate and private clients, corporate finance and treasury operations. The main focus is on lending to small and medium-sized enterprises; the retail services sector is developing less actively. As of the spring of 2011, the bank had 106 branches in Russia and a representative office in Belarus, over 985 thousand individual clients and more than 22.6 thousand corporate clients.

Performance indicators
In 2010, the bank's share in the Russian lending market was 2.18%, in the deposit market – 1.36%. The number of personnel in the spring of 2011 is 3.7 thousand people. Financial indicators of the bank as of December 31, 2011, following the results of 2011 in accordance with International Financial Reporting Standards (IFRS).

References

External links
  

Banks established in 1989
1989 establishments in the Soviet Union
Banks of Russia
Banks of the Soviet Union
Companies based in Moscow
UniCredit subsidiaries
Russian subsidiaries of foreign companies